Altitude-azimuth, alt-azimuth, or alt-az may refer to:
 Horizontal coordinate system, or altitude-azimuth coordinates
 Altazimuth mount, a two-axis telescope mount